The men's 10,000 metres event at the 1994 Commonwealth Games was held on 27 August in Victoria, British Columbia

Results

References

10000
1994